"Resan till dig" ("The journey to you") is the first Swedish-language single by Belarusian-Norwegian artist Alexander Rybak in collaboration with Swedish poet and artist Mats Paulson. The song was released as the lead and only single from his third studio album Visa vid vindens ängar (2011). It was released in Norway on 8 June 2011 as a digital download on iTunes.

Critical reception
"Resan till dig" was one of Rybak's most appreciated single by music critics since "Fairytale". Eurovisionary called it the most commercial single from his album Visa vid videns änger.

Live performances
On 10 June 2011 Alexander performed the live on Norwegian TV show God Morgen Norge. On 30 June 2011 he performed the song live on Norwegian entertainment TV show Allsang på Grensen.

In Sweden, he performed the song at Lotta på Liseberg on 20 June 2011.

Track listing

Release history

References

Alexander Rybak songs
2011 singles
2011 songs
Songs written by Mats Paulson
Songs written by Alexander Rybak